Cees van der Eijk is a Dutch political scientist, a Corresponding Member of the Royal Netherlands Academy of Arts and Sciences (KNAW), and a Honorary Fellow of the Amsterdam School of Communication Research, University of Amsterdam. He is Professor of Social Science Research Methods at the University of Nottingham. He was Professor of Political Science at the University of Amsterdam until 2004. Van der Eijk sits on the Research Advisory Board of the Committee on Standards in Public Life.

Publications

Monographs 
 The Essence of Politics (Amsterdam University Press, 2019)

Co-authored books

 Consequences of Context: How the Social, Political, and Economic Environment Affects Voting (Rowman & Littlefield, 2021),  with Hermann Schmitt and Paolo Segatti
 Elections and Voters (2009), with Mark N. Franklin
 The Economy and the Vote: Economic Conditions and Elections in Fifteen Countries (Cambridge University Press, 2007), with  Wouter van der Brug and Mark N. Franklin
 Choosing Europe? The European Electorate and National Politics in the Face of Union (1996), with Mark N. Franklin

References

Members of the Royal Netherlands Academy of Arts and Sciences
Year of birth missing (living people)
Living people
Dutch political scientists